Jafar Al-Bagir (born 15 August 1982) is a Saudi Arabian weightlifter. He competed in the 2004 Summer Olympics.

References

1982 births
Living people
Weightlifters at the 2004 Summer Olympics
Saudi Arabian male weightlifters
Olympic weightlifters of Saudi Arabia
21st-century Saudi Arabian people